Tonbridge was a parliamentary constituency in Kent, centred on the town of Tonbridge.  It returned one Member of Parliament (MP)  to the House of Commons of the Parliament of the United Kingdom.

The constituency was created for the 1918 general election, replacing the previous Tunbridge constituency.  It was abolished for the February 1974 general election, when it was replaced by the new Tonbridge and Malling constituency.

Boundaries
1918–1950: The Borough of Royal Tunbridge Wells, the Urban Districts of Tonbridge and Southborough, and the Rural District of Tonbridge.

1950–1974: As 1918 but with redrawn boundaries.

Members of Parliament

Election results

Elections in the 1910s

Elections in the 1920s

Elections in the 1930s 

General Election 1939–40:

Another General Election was required to take place before the end of 1940. The political parties had been making preparations for an election to take place and by the Autumn of 1939, the following candidates had been selected; 
Conservative: Adrian Baillie
Labour: R. E. L. Bowyer
Liberal: Richard Matthews
British Union: E J Crawford

Elections in the 1940s

Elections in the 1950s

Elections in the 1960s

Elections in the 1970s

References

Tonbridge
Parliamentary constituencies in Kent (historic)
Constituencies of the Parliament of the United Kingdom established in 1918
Constituencies of the Parliament of the United Kingdom disestablished in 1974